Owen McCarty, Ph.D. is an American biomedical engineer who studies the dynamics of the vascular system in the context of cancer

metastasis, cardiovascular disease, and inflammation. He is the Douglas Strain Professor and Chair of the Biomedical Engineering Department at Oregon Health & Science University (OHSU) and a fellow of the American Heart Association.

Education and career 
McCarty received his B.S. in Chemical Engineering from SUNY-Buffalo. He attended Johns Hopkins University to pursue his Ph.D. with Konstantinos Konstantopoulos and investigate tumor cell receptors for white blood cells and platelets. He completed his post-doctoral training under the mentorship of Steve Watson as a Wellcome Trust Fellow in the Pharmacology Department at the University of Oxford and University of Birmingham. In 2005, he accepted a faculty position in the Department of Biomedical Engineering at Oregon Health & Science University. He has served as chair of the Biomedical Engineering Department since 2019 and orchestrated collaborative partnerships with OHSU's School of Medicine, School of Dentistry, and external institutions.

Current work and achievements 
McCarty investigates fluid mechanics and cellular biology of the vasculature with the goal of translating these insights into molecular-targeted therapies. His research program has helped take two drug candidates to clinical trials and has also provided insight on the anti-cancer effects of aspirin.

Honors and awards 

 2002: Howard & Jacqueline Chertkof Endowed Fellowship, Johns Hopkins University
 2003: University Merit Review Award, University of Oxford
 2004 British Journal of Haematology Research Trust Award
 2004: Paper of the Year in the Platelets Section of the Journal of Thrombosis and Haemostasis
 2004: International Society on Thrombosis and Haemostasis Young Investigator Award
 2005: Gordon Research Conference Speaker Award
 2007: Paper of the Year in the Platelets Section of the Journal of Thrombosis and Haemostasis
 2009: American Heart Association Karl Link New Investigator Award in Thrombosis
 2010: American Heart Association Kenneth M. Brinkhous Young Investigator in Thrombosis Finalist
 2013: American Heart Association Established Investigator Award
 2014: Fellow of the American Heart Association
 2019: Best Basic Science Award at the International Sepsis Forum
 2021: Douglas Strain Endowed Professorship, OHSU Department of Biomedical Engineering

Notable Publications 

 McCarty, O. J., Mousa, S. A., Bray, P. F., & Konstantopoulos, K. (2000). Immobilized platelets support human colon carcinoma cell tethering, rolling, and firm adhesion under dynamic flow conditions. Blood, The Journal of the American Society of Hematology, 96(5), 1789-1797.
 McCarty, O. J., Larson, M. K., Auger, J. M., Kalia, N., Atkinson, B. T., Pearce, A. C., ... & Watson, S. P. (2005). Rac1 is essential for platelet lamellipodia formation and aggregate stability under flow. Journal of biological chemistry, 280(47), 39474-39484.
 Cheng, Q., Tucker, E. I., Pine, M. S., Sisler, I., Matafonov, A., Sun, M. F., ... McCarty, O. J. T., ... & Gailani, D. (2010). A role for factor XIIa–mediated factor XI activation in thrombus formation in vivo. Blood, The Journal of the American Society of Hematology, 116(19), 3981-3989.
 Aslan, J. E., & McCarty, O. J. (2013). Rho GTPases in platelet function. Journal of Thrombosis and Haemostasis, 11(1), 35-46.
 Itakura, A., & McCarty, O. J. (2013). Pivotal role for the mTOR pathway in the formation of neutrophil extracellular traps via regulation of autophagy. American Journal of Physiology. Cell Physiology, 305(3), C348-C354.

References 

Living people
21st-century American scientists
Biomedical engineers
Year of birth missing (living people)